Sebha or Sebha is a Saharan desert oasis town in the Fezzan region of southwest Libya. It is close to the capital of the Sabha District, Sabha.

Geography 

See also 
 List of cities in Libya

References 

Populated places in Sabha District
Oases of Libya